180 Brisbane is a 152-metre skyscraper in Brisbane, Queensland, Australia. The site is owned by Daisho.

The modern style office building is located at 180 Ann Street in the Brisbane central business district. The building was nicknamed the Brisbane River Tower as the building facade shows a huge imprint of the Brisbane River.

The Commonwealth Bank of Australia is the anchor tenant who have leased six floors and the building's sky signage rights.

Construction of the tower was delayed due to a slump in Brisbane's commercial property market. The building was completed in late 2015.

See also

 List of tallest buildings in Brisbane

References

External links

 
Building at Daisho website
Building at MBM website
Building at Brisbane Development website
Building at The Skyscraper Center database

Skyscrapers in Brisbane
Office buildings in Brisbane
Neomodern architecture
Ann Street, Brisbane
Skyscraper office buildings in Australia
Office buildings completed in 2015